Ament is a surname. Notable people with the surname include:

 Jeff Ament (born 1963), American rock bassist
 Pat Ament (born 1946), American rock climber
 Tom Ament (1937–2014), American politician
 Vanessa Ament (born 1955), American Foley artist and author
 William Scott Ament (born 1851), controversial American missionary to China criticized by Mark Twain